The List of members from the second term of the Assembly of Experts. consists of names of the members during the second term of the Assembly of Experts from 1990 to 1998. Elections for the Assembly of Experts occurs every 8 years.

"Assembly of experts (of the Leadership)", or the "Council of Experts" is the deliberative body empowered to appoint and dismiss the Supreme Leader of Iran; and Seyyed Ali Khamenei is the current supreme leader of Iran. Ali Khamenei was the Leader during this term. 

The elections took place on 8 October 1990, with the Inauguration occurring on 20 February 1991.

Members 
The list is ordered Alphabetically.

Members with * next to their name, indicates they died while in office.

 Bushehr

 Abdul-Nabi Namazi

 Chaharmahal and Bakhtiari

 Ebrahim Amini

 East Azerbaijan

 Ali Orumian
 Khalil Boyukzadeh
 Mohammad Ali Haghi - * (14 January 1999)
 Mohsen Mojtahed Shabestari
 Morteza Bani Fazel - 
 Moslem Malakouti
 Seyed Abolfazl Mousavi Tabrizi

 Fars

 Ali Sheikh Mohad -
 Assad-Allah Imani
  
 Seyed Mohammad Faghie 
 Seyed Mohammad Hossein Hosseini Arsanjani -

 Gilan

 Abbas Mahfouzi 
 
 
 Zaynolabideen Ghorbani

 Hamadan

 
 Seyed Abolhassan Mousavi Hamadani -

 Hormozgan

 

 Ilam

 Ghorbanali Dorri-Najafabadi

 Isfahan

 Hossein Mazaheri 
 Jalal Al-Din Taheri 
 Morteza Moghtadai 
 Seyed Esmail Hashemi - 
 

 Kerman

 Ali Movahedi-Kermani
 
 

 Kermanshah

 Mohammad Reza Kazemi - 
 Mojtaba Haj Akhund -

 Khorasan

 Abbas Vaez-Tabasi
 Abdol Javad Gharavian -
 Abolghasem Khazali
 Abolhassan Moghaddasi Shirazi - 
 
 
 
 

 Khuzestan

 Ahmad Jannati
 Mohammad Ali Mousavi Jazayeri
 Mohammad-Taqi Mesbah-Yazdi
 Mohsen Araki
 Seyyed Ali Shafiei

 Kohgiluyeh and Boyer-Ahmad

 Seyed Karamatollah Malek-Hosseini

 Kurdistan

  * (1997)
 Seyed Ali Hosseini -

 Lorestan

 
 

 Markazi

 Abolfazl Khonsari - 
 Seyed Mahdi Rohani

 Mazandaran

 Abdollah Javadi-Amoli
 
 Hadi Rohani
 Hossein Mohammadi La'ini - 
 Seyed Habibollah Taheri - 
 Seyed Kazem Noor Mofidi
 

 Semnan

 Mohammad Momen

 Sistan and Baluchestan

  
 Seyed Mahdi Abadi -

 Tehran

 Ahmad Azari Qomi
 Ahmad Khomeini * (17 March 1995)
 Akbar Hashemi Rafsanjani
 Ali Meshkini
 Gholamreza Rezvani
 Hadi Khosroshahi
 
 Mohammad Bagher Bagheri Kani
  
 Mohammed Emami-Kashani
 Mohammad Mohammadi Gilani
 Mohammad Reyshahri
 Mohammad Yazdi
 Mohsen Kharazi
  
 Seyed Mohammad Bagher Asadi Khonsari -

 West Azerbaijan

 Ali Akbar Ghoreishi
  
 

 Yazd

 Seyed Abbas Khatam Yazdi -

 Zanjan

  
 Seyed Esmaeil Mousavi Zanjani
 Seyed Hassan Mousavi Poor (Shali) -

See also 

 1990 Iranian Assembly of Experts election
 Assembly of Experts
 List of members in the First Term of the Council of Experts
 List of members in the Third Term of the Council of Experts
List of members in the Fourth Term of the Council of Experts
List of members in the Fifth Term of the Council of Experts
 List of chairmen of the Assembly of Experts

References 

Assembly of Experts
Lists of office-holders
Electoral colleges
Politics of Iran
Government of the Islamic Republic of Iran
Assemblies in Iran